International Church of Las Vegas (ICLV) is a multi-site non-denominational church congregation headquartered in Las Vegas, Nevada. Paul Goulet is its Senior Pastor. His wife Denise Goulet is Senior Associate Pastor. The church website describes its mission as "multicultural, healing, prophetic church all about giving the grace of Jesus to Las Vegas".

The church's three local campuses serves thousands of worshipers from the Las Vegas metropolitan area on a weekly basis. 
Summerlin Main Campus at 8100 Westcliff Drive, Las Vegas, NV 89145
Mountain Church Northwest at 3425 Cliff Shadows Parkway, Las Vegas, NV 89129 
Dream Center, Spring Valley at 6620 West Katie Avenue, Las Vegas, Nevada 89103

The church also has an online extension, iChurch, that broadcasts ICLV church services live.

The church also hosts the International Christian Academy, which educates students ranging from preschool through grade 8, as well as Kairos School of Ministry, a CPP campus of Northwest University.

On October 18, 2020, U.S. President Donald Trump took part in the Sunday services at ICLV near Summerlin with Pastor Goulet pledging his support to Trump during the 2020 United States presidential election. It was his third visit to the church.

References

External links

Official website
ICLV YouTube channel

Evangelical churches in Nevada
Culture of Las Vegas
Churches in Clark County, Nevada